Canopus Islands is a group of small islands just north of the Klung Islands in the eastern part of Holme Bay, Mac. Robertson Land. They were mapped by Norwegian cartographers from air photos taken by the Lars Christensen Expedition, 1936–37, and named by the Australian National Antarctic Research Expeditions after the star Canopus.

See also 
 Canopus Island
 List of Antarctic and sub-Antarctic islands

References
 

Islands of Mac. Robertson Land